Leslie Easterbrook is an American actress and producer. She played Sgt./Lt./Capt. Debbie Callahan in the Police Academy films and Rhonda Lee on the television series Laverne & Shirley.

Early life
Easterbrook was adopted when she was nine months old; her adoptive parents, Carl and Helen Easterbrook, raised her in Arcadia, Nebraska.  She attended and graduated from Kearney High School and Stephens College. Her father was a music professor and her mother was an English teacher at the University of Nebraska at Kearney.

Career
Easterbrook appeared in about a dozen feature films and over 300 television episodes.

One of her earlier successes was in 1980 as Rhonda Lee beginning with season six of Laverne & Shirley. The role of Rhonda was part of the show's change of locale from Milwaukee to Hollywood.

Easterbrook performed as Debbie Callahan in the Police Academy film series.
Easterbrook told author Paul Stenning, "The funny thing is, that's not me at all. I'd never played tough. I'd played all kinds of things, but I'd never played someone who's intimidating or someone that was aggressive sexually. I was of a size that I never played the girl who got the guy. I wondered how I could do it. But I did. I went for the audition and I scared the producer and the director and then they backed up in their chairs and I went 'Oh no, now I really blew it. I scared them'. So I left the audition upset. I didn't get to read the script until I got the part. I thought it was outrageous and so funny."

Easterbrook appeared in Murder, She Wrote, Diagnosis: Murder, Hangin' with Mr. Cooper, Baywatch, Matlock, Hunter, and The Dukes of Hazzard. In 2005, she replaced Karen Black as Mother Firefly in Rob Zombie's The Devil's Rejects, the sequel to the 2003 horror film, House of 1000 Corpses. In 2007, she played security guard Patty Frost in Rob Zombie's remake of Halloween. In 2008, she played as Betty in the thriller/horror film House. In 2010, she starred in The Afflicted. She also appeared on Ryan's Hope as Devlin Kowalski. Her voice work has been featured in several projects, including Batman: The Animated Series and Superman: The Animated Series.

She sang the National Anthem at Super Bowl XVII which landed her starring roles in musicals on Broadway and throughout the country; she recorded a song for the soundtrack of Police Academy: Mission to Moscow.

Easterbrook made a video, Real Beginner's Guide to the Shotgun Sports, the first in a series designed to encourage and prepare nonshooters for their first shooting experience. Easterbrook serves on the board of the National Law Enforcement Officers Memorial Fund, and supports a number of children's charities. Easterbrook is a National Rifle Association member and has served on the board of directors of the California Rifle and Pistol Association.

Personal life
Leslie Easterbrook was born on July 29th,1949 in Los Angeles, California and is married to M*A*S*H writer Dan Wilcox. She was previously married to fellow actor Victor Holchak.

She is good friends with former Police Academy cast member Scott Thomson and was close friends with Marion Ramsey. Easterbrook describes the cast of the original film as a "big family".

References

External links

20th-century American actresses
21st-century American actresses
Actresses from Nebraska
American adoptees
American film actresses
American soap opera actresses
American television actresses
American voice actresses
Living people
People from Valley County, Nebraska
1949 births